Werekela is a village and seat of the commune of Yeredon Saniona in the Cercle of Niono in the Ségou Region of southern-central Mali.

References

Populated places in Ségou Region